The American singer-songwriter Kesha has sold over 100 million records worldwide to date, including 87 million tracks and streams as of 2017 and 14 million album equivalent units as of 2019. She is also certified for 40.5 million records as a lead artist in the United States alone by the Recording Industry Association of America, with 35.5 million certified digital singles and 5 million certified albums. Including her featured singles, her total combined with her lead singles stands at 53 million, bringing her total record certifications to stand at 58 million, also making her the 15th highest certified female artist in the United States. That said, she topped eight charts on the 2010 Billboard Year-End Chart, including Top New Artists, Hot 100 Songs and Hot 100 Artists.

Having been nominated for 91 awards, Kesha has been nominated for seven Billboard Music Awards, two Grammy Awards, three American Music Awards, five MTV Video Music Awards, and three MTV Europe Music Awards, winning the award for MTV Europe Music Award for Best New Act in 2010. The singer has also been honored with the Gretchen Wyler Genesis Award, the Human Rights Campaign's Visibility Award, the Billboard Women in Music Trailblazer Award, and the Humane Society of the United States' Voice for the Animals Award.

AMFT Awards

!Ref.
|-
| 2017
| "Praying"
| Best Pop Solo Performance
| 
|

ARIA Music Awards
The ARIA Music Awards are presented annually by the Australian Recording Industry Association to recognize achievements in the Australian music industry. 

|-
| 2011
| Herself
| Best International Artist
|

ASCAP Pop Music Awards
The annual ASCAP Pop Music Awards honors the songwriters and publishers of the most performed pop songs. 

|-
| 2011
| "Tik Tok"
| rowspan="2"| Most Performed Song
| 
|-
| 2019
| "Good Old Days"
|

American Music Awards
The American Music Awards is an annual major American music award show by the American Broadcasting Company. It was established in 1973. Kesha has been nominated for 3 awards.

|-
|rowspan="3"|2010
|rowspan="3" | Herself
|Artist of the Year
|
|-
|Favorite Pop/Rock Female Artist
|
|-
|T-Mobile Breakthrough Artist
|
|}

Billboard

Billboard Music Awards
The Billboard Music Award is an honor given by Billboard, a publication and music popularity chart covering the music business of the previous year.

|-
|rowspan="6"|2011
|rowspan="5"|Herself
|Top New Artist
|
|-
|Top Female Artist
|
|-
|Top Pop Artist
|
|-
|Top Hot 100 Artist
|
|-
|Top Digital Songs Artist
|
|-
|Animal
|Top Pop Album
|
|-
|2014
|"Timber" (with Pitbull)
|Top Rap Song
|
|}

Billboard Women in Music
Established in 2007, Billboard Women in Music recognizes influential female artists and music executives who have made significant contributions to the business and who, through their work and continued success, inspire generations of women to take on increasing responsibilities within the field.

!Ref.
|-
|2016
|Herself
|Trailblazer Award
|
|
|}

Bravo Otto
Bravo Otto is a German accolade honoring excellence of performers in film, television and music. Kesha has won one award.

|-
|2010
|Herself
|Best Female Singer
|
|}

British LGBT Awards
The British LGBT Awards celebrate the UK's most loved LGBT personalities, innovators and companies, dubbed the "Gay Oscars" by the press. Kesha has received one nomination.

|-
|2019
|Herself
|Music Artist
|
|}

BMI Pop Awards
Broadcast Music, Inc. (BMI) is one of three United States performing rights organizations, along with ASCAP and SESAC. It collects license fees on behalf of songwriters, composers, and music publishers and distributes them as royalties to those members whose works have been performed. 

|-
|rowspan="2"|2011
|"Tik Tok"
|rowspan="7"|Award-Winning Songs
|
|-
|"Your Love Is My Drug"
|
|-
|rowspan="3"|2012
|"Blow"
|
|-
|"We R Who We R"
|
|-
|"Till The World Ends"
|
|-
|rowspan="2"|2019
|"Praying"
|
|-
|"Good Old Days"
|
|}

Clio Awards
The Clio Awards is an annual award program that recognizes innovation and creativity in advertising, design and communication.

!Ref.
|-
| 2019
| Rainbow: The Film
| Music Marketing: Five Minutes and Over (Silver)
| 
|

Clio Cannabis Awards
The Clio Cannabis Awards celebrates creators at the forefront of cannabis creative, marketing, and communications.

!Ref.
|-
| rowspan=2| 2022
| rowspan=2| "Taste So Good"
| Integrated Campaign (Gold)
| 
| 
|-
| Partnerships & Collaborations
| 
|

ECHO Awards
The ECHO Award is a German music award granted every year by the Deutsche Phono-Akademie, an association of recording companies.

|-
|2011
|Herself
|Best International Newcomer 
|
|}

Eska Music Awards
The Eska Music Awards is a major Polish awards ceremony for national and international music launched in 2002 by Radio Eska. The ceremony is held in Łódź, Poland and takes place in April every following year.

|-
|2010
|Herself
|Best New Artist
|
|}

The Flecking Awards

|-
| rowspan=5|2011
| rowspan=4|Herself
| Most Annoying
| 
|-
| The Star You Love to Hate 
| 
|-
| Put Some Clothes On!
| 
|-
| Best Female Musician
| 
|-
| "We R Who We R"
| Best Single
| 
|-
| 2012
| Herself
| Female Twitterer Of The Year
|

GAFFA Awards
The GAFFA Awards (Danish: GAFFA Prisen) have been awarded since 1991 by Danish magazine of the same name in the field of popular music.

|-
| rowspan=2|2021
| Herself
| Best International Solo Act
| 
|-
| High Road
| Best International Album
|

GLAAD Media Awards
The GLAAD Media Awards were created in 1990 by the Gay & Lesbian Alliance Against Defamation to "recognize and honor media for their fair, accurate and inclusive representations of the LGBT community and the issues that affect their lives."

|-
|2018
|Rainbow
|Outstanding Music Artist
|
|}

Grammy Awards
The Grammy Awards are awarded annually by the National Academy of Recording Arts and Sciences of the United States for outstanding achievements in the music industry. Often considered the highest music honor, the awards were established in 1958.

|-
| rowspan="2"|2018
|Rainbow
|Best Pop Vocal Album
|
|-
|"Praying"
|Best Pop Solo Performance
|

HRC Equality Gala
The Human Rights Campaign Fund was founded by Steve Endean in 1980 as one of the first gay and lesbian political action committee in the United States. HRC's Visibility Award recognizes the outstanding efforts of those who use their incredible talent and visibility to help better the lives of LGBT people.

!Ref.
|-
|2016
|Herself
|Visibility Award
|
|
|}

Humane Society of the United States

Genesis Awards
The Genesis Awards are awarded annually by the Humane Society of the United States to individuals in the major news and entertainment media for producing outstanding works which raise public awareness of animal issues. Presented by the HSUS Hollywood Outreach program, the awards show takes place every March in California.

!Ref.
|-
|2013
|Herself
|The Gretchen Wyler Award
|
|
|}

To The Rescue! Gala
The Humane Society of the United States' 2019 To The Rescue! Los Angeles Gala was held on May 4, 2019.

|-
|2019
|Herself
|Voice for the Animals
|
|}

iHeartRadio Music Awards
The iHeartRadio Music Award was founded by iHeartRadio in 2014. The event is broadcast live on NBC. Awards were presented to the world's best-selling artists in the various categories and to the best-selling artists from each major territory.

|-
|2014
|"Timber" (with Pitbull)
|Best Collaboration 
|
|-
|2019
|"Here Comes The Change"
|Song That Left Us Shook
|
|}

Hollywood Music in Media Awards
The Hollywood Music in Media Awards (HMMA) honors music in film, television, video games, commercials, and trailers. 

|-
|2018
|"Here Comes The Change"
|Best Original Song - Feature Film
|
|}

International Dance Music Awards
The International Dance Music Award was established in 1985. It is a part of the Winter Music Conference, a weeklong electronic music event held annually. 

|-
|2011
|"Your Love Is My Drug"
| Best Pop Dance Track
|
|}

Japan Gold Disc Awards
The Japan Gold Disc Awards are an annual ceremony hosted in Japan. The winner are based by sales provided by The Recording Industry Association of Japan.

|-
|rowspan="3"|2011
|rowspan="3"|Herself
|International Artist of The Year
|
|-
|International New Artist of The Year
|
|-
|Three Best New Artists
|
|}

Juno Awards
The Juno Awards are presented annually to Canadian musical artists and bands to acknowledge their artistic and technical achievements in all aspects of music. New members of the Canadian Music Hall of Fame are also inducted as part of the awards ceremonies.mWinners are currently chosen by either members of the Canadian Academy of Recording Arts and Sciences or a panel of experts depending on the award. In almost all of the main general categories, nominees are determined by sales during the qualifying period; in genre-specific categories, they are determined by panel.

|-
|2011
|Animal
|International Album of the Year
|
|}

MTV Awards

MTV Video Music Awards
The MTV Video Music Awards is an annual awards ceremony established in 1984 by MTV.

|-
|rowspan=4|2010
|Herself
|Best New Artist
|
|-
|rowspan="2"|"Tik Tok"
|Best Female Video
|
|-
|Best Pop Video
|
|-
|"My First Kiss" (with 3OH!3)
|rowspan="2"|Best Collaboration
|
|-
|rowspan="1"| 2014
|"Timber" (with Pitbull)
|
|}

MTV Europe Music Awards
The MTV Europe Music Awards (EMA) were established in 1994 by MTV Networks Europe to celebrate the most popular music videos in Europe.

|-
|rowspan="2"|2010
|rowspan="3"|Herself
|Best New Act
|
|-
|Best Push Act
|
|-
|2012
|Best World Stage Performance
|
|}

MTV Italian Music Awards
The MTV Italian Music Awards, also known as TRL (Total Request Live) Awards, are hosted annually in Italy by MTV. They award the best video, performers, and artists of the year. 

|-
| 2010
| rowspan=3|Herself
| Best Look 
| 
|-
| 2011
| rowspan=2|Wonder Woman Award
| 
|-
| 2013
|

MTV Video Music Brazil
The MTV Video Music Brazil, commonly known as VMB, was MTV Brazil's annual award ceremony, established in 1995. In 2013, due to the devolution of the brand MTV to Viacom, and with the reformulation of the channel, the ceremony was discontinued. 

|-
| 2010
| Herself
| Best International Act 
|

MVPA Awards
The MVPA Awards are annually presented by a Los Angeles-based music trade organization to honor the year's best music videos.

|-
| 2012
| "Blow"
| Best Direction of a Female Artist
|

MuchMusic Video Awards
The MuchMusic Video Awards (also known as (the) MMVA or MMVAs) are annual awards presented by the Canadian music video channel MuchMusic to honor the year's best music videos.

|-
|rowspan="2"|2010
|rowspan="2"|"Tik Tok"
|International Video of the Year – Artist
|
|-
|UR FAVE: International Video
|
|-
|rowspan="2"|2011
|"Take It Off"
|rowspan="2"|MuchMUSIC.COM Most Watched Video
|
|-
|"Your Love Is My Drug"
|
|}

NRJ Music Awards
The NRJ Music Awards is a major music ceremony in France, held annually by the radio station NRJ in partnership with the television network TF1. 

|-
| 2011
| Herself
| International Breakthrough of the Year 
|

NewNowNext Awards
The NewNowNext Awards is an American annual entertainment awards show, presented by the lesbian, gay, bisexual and transgender-themed channel Logo. Launched in 2008, awards are presented both for LGBT-specific and general interest achievements in entertainment and pop culture.

|-
|2010
|Herself
|Best New Indulgence
|
|-
|2013
|"C'Mon"
|That's My Jam
|
|}

Nickelodeon Australian Kids' Choice Awards
The Nickelodeon Australian Kids' Choice Awards honor entertainers with a blimp trophy, as voted by children.

|-
|2010
|"Tik Tok"
|Fave Song
|
|}

NME Awards
The NME Awards is an annual music awards show in the United Kingdom, founded by the music magazine, NME (New Musical Express). Though the accolades given are entirely genuine, the ceremony itself is usually carried out in a humorous and jovial manner, and have included categories in the past like "Villain of the year" and "Worst Record". The trophies given to the winners resemble an extended middle finger.

|-
|2011
|Herself
|Least Stylish
|
|}

People's Choice Awards
The People's Choice Awards are a venue for the American public to honor their favorite actors and actresses, musical performers, television shows, and motion pictures. It is fans who voted.

|-
|2010
|Herself
|Favorite Breakout Artist
|
|}

PETA Libby Awards
The Libby Awards is an annual awards ceremony organized by PETA's youth arm peta2.

|-
|rowspan="2"|2012
|rowspan="2"|Herself
|Most Animal Friendly Pop/Hip-Hop Artist
|
|-
|Best peta2 Ad
|
|}

Premios 40 Principales
Los Premios 40 Principales were created in 2006 by Spanish music radio station Los 40 Principales to celebrate its 40th anniversary.

|-
|rowspan=2|2010
|Herself
|Best International Artist
|
|-
|"Tik Tok"
|Best International Song
|
|}

Teen Choice Awards
The Teen Choice Awards is an annual fan voted awards show established in 1999 by the Fox Broadcasting Company.

|-
|rowspan="6"|2010
|rowspan="3"|Herself
|Choice Music: Female Artist
|
|-
|Choice Music: Breakout Artist – Female
|
|-
|Choice Summer Music Star: Female
|
|-
|Animal
|Choice Music: Album – Pop
|
|-
|rowspan="2"|"Your Love Is My Drug"
|Choice Music: Single
|
|-
|Choice Summer Music: Single
|
|-
|2016
|Herself
| Choice Style: Female
|
|}

Webby Awards
The Webby Awards is an award for excellence on the Internet presented annually by The International Academy of Digital Arts and Sciences.

|-
|rowspan="2"|2019
|"I Need a Woman to Love"
|Best Editing
|
|-
|Rainbow The Film
|Best Online Music Film
|
|-
|}

World Music Awards
The World Music Award is an international awards show founded in 1989 that annually honors recording artists based on worldwide sales figures provided by the International Federation of the Phonographic Industry (IFPI).

|-
| 2010
| rowspan=4|Herself
| World's Best New Artist
| 
|-
| rowspan=8|2014
| World's Best Female Artist
| 
|-
| World's Best Live Act 
| 
|-
| World's Best Entertainer of the Year 
| 
|-
| rowspan=2|"Crazy Kids" (with will.i.am)
| World's Best Song
| 
|-
| rowspan=2|World's Best Video
| 
|-
| rowspan=2|"Die Young"
| 
|-
| World's Best Song
| 
|-
| Warrior
| World's Best Album
|

Žebřík Music Awards

!Ref.
|-
| 2010
| Herself
| Best International Discovery
| 
|

References

Kesha
Kesha